Lethabo Power Station in the Free State, South Africa, is a large coal fired power station owned and operated by Eskom.

Power generation
The station is located between Vereeniging and Sasolburg in the Free State and consists of six 618MW units for a total installed capacity of 3,708MW. Total efficiency at Turbine Maximum Continuous Rating is 37.80%

Lethabo burns coal with a calorific value of 15 - 16 MJ/kg and an ash content of 42%. It is the only power station in the world running on such low grade coal.

The Lethabo power station has approximately 1100 employees.

Technical details 
Six 618MW units 
Installed capacity: 3 708MW 
2001 capacity: 3558MW 
Design efficiency at rated turbine MCR (%): 37.80% 
Ramp rate: 33.33% per hour 
Average availability over last 3 years: 93.05% 
Average production over last 3 years: 21 572GWh

History 
Construction of Lethabo started in 1980 and by December 1990, the station was fully operational. The station has been built on 11 000 concrete piles which were sunk 25 metres deep. The reason being to alleviate the heaving clay problem after some 190 000 bluegum trees were removed during site clearing. At the time, it was the largest piling contract ever awarded to a South African contractor.

See also 

 List of power stations in South Africa

References
RSA

External links

 Lethabo Power Station on the Eskom-Website

Coal-fired power stations in South Africa
Buildings and structures in the Free State (province)
Economy of the Free State (province)
Metsimaholo